This is a list of the highest-paid dead celebrities in the world as ranked by Forbes magazine since October 2001.

2022 list
The 2022 list:

J.R.R. Tolkien earned $500 million from the sale of Middle-Earth Enterprises.

2021 list
The 2021 list:

Netflix announced the acquisition of the Roald Dahl Story Company, which manages the rights to Roald Dahl's stories and characters, for a fee of $684 million (£500m). Dahl's heirs held at least a 75% stake before the company was acquired.

2020 list
The 2020 list:

2019 list
The 2019 list:

2018 list
The 2018 list:

Michael Jackson brought in $287 million from the sale of his estate's stake in Sony/ATV Music Publishing to Sony.

2017 list
The 2017 list:

2016 list
The 2016 list:

Michael Jackson had the largest annual gain for an entertainer, living or dead, due to the $750 million sale of his half of the Sony/ATV Music Publishing catalogue.

2015 list
The 2015 list:

2014 list
The 2014 list:

2013 list
The 2013 list:

2012 list

The 2012 list:

2011 list
The 2011 list:

2010 list
The 2010 list:

2009 list
The 2009 list:

2008 list

The 2008 list:

2007 list
The 2007 list:

2006 list

The 2006 list:

2005 list
The 2005 list:

2004 list
The 2004 list:

2003 list
The 2003 list:

2002 list
The 2002 list:

2001 list
The 2001 list:

References 

celebrities
Lists of people by magazine appearance